Lancaster College may refer to:

 Lancaster and Morecambe College, a further education college between Lancaster and Morecambe, Lancashire, England
 Lancaster Bible College, a private college in Lancaster, Pennsylvania
 Lancaster College (fictional), a fictional Oxford college in the film Incense for the Damned

See also
 Lancaster University